Looker is a 1981 American science fiction film written and directed by Michael Crichton and starring Albert Finney, Susan Dey, and James Coburn. The film is a suspense/science-fiction piece that comments upon and satirizes media, advertising, television's effects on the populace, and a ridiculous standard of beauty.

Though sparse in visual effects, the film is the first commercial film to attempt to make a computer-generated, three-dimensional, solid-looking model of a whole human body. However, as with its predecessors Futureworld, Star Wars, and Alien, this was an example of "CGI representing CGI", and only depicted on CRT screens in the film, rather than being used as a special effect. The model had no skeletal or facial movements and was not a character. Looker was also the first film to create three-dimensional (3D) shading with a computer, months before the release of the better-known Tron.

Plot 
Dr. Larry Roberts (Finney), a Beverly Hills plastic surgeon, is puzzled when four beautiful models working in television commercials request cosmetic surgery to make changes so minor as to be imperceptible to the naked eye. When these models later start dying under mysterious circumstances, he discovers they are all linked to the same advertisement research firm.

The Digital Matrix research firm rates advertising models using a scoring system to measure the combined visual impact of various physical attributes in television commercials. In an experiment to increase their scores, some models are sent to Dr. Roberts to get cosmetic surgery to maximize their visual impact. Though the models are physically perfect after the surgery, they still are not as effective as desired, so the research firm decides to use a different approach. Each model is offered a contract to have her body scanned digitally to create 3D computer-generated models, then the 3D models are animated for use in commercials. The contracts seem to be incredibly lucrative for the models; once their bodies are represented digitally, they get a paycheck for life, never having to work again, since their digital models are used for all their future work in commercials.

However, when these same models start dying under mysterious circumstances, Roberts becomes suspicious and decides to investigate Digital Matrix. He has a strong interest in investigating the deaths: he is considered a prime suspect by the police (from evidence planted at the scene of one of the murders) and his most recent patient, Cindy (Susan Dey), with whom he begins a romantic relationship, is the last of the models to be digitally scanned.

During his investigation, Roberts discovers some advanced technology that the Digital Matrix corporation is using to hypnotize consumers into buying the products they advertise. He also discovers a light pulse device, the Light Ocular-Oriented Kinetic Emotive Responses (L.O.O.K.E.R.) gun, that gives the illusion of invisibility by instantly mesmerizing its victims into losing all sense of time.

Cast
 Albert Finney as Dr. Larry Roberts
 James Coburn as John Reston
 Susan Dey as Cindy Fairmont
 Leigh Taylor-Young as Jennifer Long
 Dorian Harewood as Lieutenant Masters
 Darryl Hickman as Dr. Jim Belfield
 Terri Welles as Lisa Convey
 Terry Kiser as commercial director

Production
Crichton started thinking about the subject of the film in 1975. He says he went to a Los Angeles computer company to find out how they could create copies in commercials without looking too ridiculous and discovered a company in Texas was already doing it, called tomography.

Looker became an early production of The Ladd Company. It was Leigh Taylor-Young's first film in eight years.

James Coburn later said "My part was pretty much on the cutting room floor. They really pissed that film away. They had Albert Finney running around in a security guard's uniform throughout the film. It didn’t make any sense. It could have been a good picture. It was about how television controls. It was about how commercials manipulate people to buy products, politicians, whatever. But, they cut the film up for a television print. I don't know why they did that. They spent some bread on the picture too. It was a $12 million production. That’s not much today, but back then it was a pretty big budget."

Reception
Looker was poorly received by critics, particularly film historian Leonard Maltin: "An intriguing premise is mishandled; the result is illogical and boring. Even Albert Finney cannot save this turkey." The film holds a 32% rating on Rotten Tomatoes based on 22 reviews. 
It was not a success at the box office.

See also 
 Timeline of CGI in film and television

References

External links 
 
 

1981 films
1980s psychological thriller films
1980s science fiction thriller films
American psychological thriller films
American science fiction thriller films
1981 computer-animated films
Films about advertising
Films about television
Films about modeling
Films directed by Michael Crichton
Films scored by Barry De Vorzon
Films set in Los Angeles
Films set in Beverly Hills, California
Fiction about mind control
Films with screenplays by Michael Crichton
The Ladd Company films
Warner Bros. films
Works about plastic surgery
1980s English-language films
1980s American films